Albinaria mixta is a species of air-breathing land snail, a terrestrial pulmonate gastropod mollusk in the family Clausiliidae, the door snails. The species is endemic to Greece and only known from the eastern Peloponnese.

References

Albinaria
Gastropods described in 1984
Endemic fauna of Greece
Molluscs of Europe